Muka is an Albanian surname. Notable people with this name include:

 Arnošt Muka (1854–1932), German and Sorbian writer and linguist
 Devi Muka (born 1976), retired Albanian footballer
 Ogert Muka (born 1979), retired Albanian footballer

References

Albanian-language surnames